Events from the year 1541 in France

Incumbents
 Monarch – Francis I

Events

Births

Full date missing
Pierre Charron, Catholic theologian and philosopher (died 1603)

Deaths

Full date missing
Georges de Selve, scholar and diplomat (born 1508)
François II de La Trémoille, nobleman (born 1505)
François Guillaume de Castelnau-Clermont-Ludève, diplomat and cardinal (born 1480)
Barthélemy de Chasseneuz, jurist (born 1480)
Jean Clouet, painter (born 1480)
Antonio Rincon, ambassador

See also

References

1540s in France